The England cricket team toured West Indies from 1 March to 5 May 2004 as part of the 2003–04 West Indian cricket season. The tour included four Tests and seven One Day Internationals.

Squad lists

Test series – The Wisden Trophy

1st Test

2nd Test 

The second test win meant that England retained the Wisden Trophy.

3rd Test 

Matthew Hoggard claimed a hat-trick in the West Indies 2nd innings. Hoggard got Ramnaresh Sarwan (caught), Shivnarine Chanderpaul (lbw) and Ryan Hinds (caught) in successive deliveries. This was the 33rd hat-trick in Test cricket and the 10th hat-trick for an Englishman.

4th Test 

Brian Lara's 400 not out is the highest score in Test cricket. His 400 consisted of 582 balls and is the fifth longest innings in Test cricket lasting 778 minutes (12 hours 58 minutes). He hit 43 fours and 4 sixes.

ODI series

1st ODI

2nd ODI

3rd ODI

4th ODI

5th ODI

6th ODI

7th ODI

Tour matches

Reaction

Aftermath

Records 
West Indies 1st test 2nd innings of 47 all out is the lowest innings scored by the West Indies.
Stephen Harmison claimed his best bowling figures of 7/12 in the 2nd innings of the 1st test. It is also the best bowling figures in Sabina Park with figures of 12.3–8–12–7.
On the 3rd Test England secured their first series win against the West Indies in the Caribbean since 1968.
Brian Lara 400 not out is the highest score by any batsmen in test cricket.
Brian Lara is the 11th batsmen to hold the world record for the  highest score in Test cricket and is the only person ever in Test cricket to regain the world record.
Brian Lara equaled Don Bradman's record of two treble centuries.
Brian Lara also scored his 375 (then world record) total in Antigua against England 10 years previously.
Graham Thorpe was also present in Lara's 375 innings 10 years previously.
Brian Lara and Ridley Jacobs 282 unbroken partnership is a West Indian partnership record for the 6th wicket.
West Indies 751/5 is the 7th highest innings total in Test cricket and 2nd highest innings total for West Indies.

References

Bibliography 
 Playfair Cricket Annual
 Wisden Cricketers Almanack

External links 
 CricketArchive
 Crininfo
 Test Averages
 ODI Averages

2004 in West Indian cricket
2004 in English cricket
2003
International cricket competitions in 2003–04
2003–04 West Indian cricket season